B. Vittalacharya (28 January 1920 – 28 May 1999) was an Indian film director and producer known for his works in Telugu and Kannada cinema. He was known as Janapada Brahma in the Telugu film industry. Vittalacharya formed his film production company Vittal Productions, which produced the first film directed by him, Rajya Lakshmi.

In 1954, he produced and directed Kanyadhanam, a revolutionary film for that time. Wishing to remake the same in Telugu, he moved to Madras and settled there. After making two more Kannada movies, he concentrated on producing and directing only Telugu movies. He also directed movies for other producers. He directed a total of 19 movies with N. T. Rama Rao, the doyen of Telugu cinema at the time. Though he did not get any awards, most of his films were box office successes and he was fondly called "Jaanapada Brahma" and "Maayaajala Mannan" by his fans. He was well known for the visual effects shown in most of his movies.

Biography
B. Vithala Acharya was born into a Kannada Madhwa Brahmin family on 28 January 1920 in Udayavara, in then Udupi Taluk as a seventh child. He was interested in dramas, Bayalata and Yakshagana since childhood. His father Padmanabhacharya was a noted ayurvedic doctor, who used to treat patients free of cost. He studied only up to third class. He left the house to seek his fortune at the age of nine years. Reaching Arasikere, he did odd jobs and finally bought an Udupi Restaurant from his cousin. He successfully ran the hotel.

He participated in the Quit India Movement against the British Government along with some friends. He was imprisoned. After release from the Jail, he handed over his hotel business to his younger brother. He established One Touring Cinema in Hassan District along with his friend Sri D. Shankar Singh and others.

He was the executive partner running the Touring Talkies on a daily basis. He multiplied the single Touring Talkies into four units. He used to watch each and every film they screened and learnt film making techniques practically. In 1944, he married Jayalakshmi Acharya, the third daughter of Sri. U. Ramadasa Acharya of K. R. Pete.

With the same friends and Shankar Singh, they moved to Mysore and formed a film production company under the banner of Mahatma Pictures. They produced 18 Kannada pictures from 1944 to 1953, among them very successful ones like Naga Kanya, Jagan Mohini, and Srinivasa Kalyana. During that period, one by one the partners parted company and finally only D.Shankar Singh and Vittala Acharya remained. Some of the films were directed by others, some by D.Shankar Singh and some by Vittala Acharya.

In 1953, he parted ways with D.Shankar Singh, and formed his own company under the banner Vittal Productions and produced and directed his first film, Rajya Lakshmi. In 1954, he produced and directed Kanyadhanam, a revolutionary film for that time. Wishing to remake the same in Telugu, he moved to Madras and settled there till his death. After making two more Kannada movies, he concentrated on producing and directing only Telugu and Tamil movies. He directed movies for other producers also.

Filmography

References

External links
 
 Complete list of films directed by B.Vittalacharya

Telugu film directors
Kannada film directors
1920 births
1999 deaths
People from Udupi
Tulu people
20th-century Indian film directors
Tamil film directors
Film directors from Karnataka
Film producers from Andhra Pradesh
Kannada film producers
Telugu film producers